Day Air Ballpark, formerly known as Fifth Third Field, is a minor league baseball stadium in Dayton, Ohio, which is the home of the Dayton Dragons, the Midwest League affiliate of the nearby Cincinnati Reds. In 2011, the Dragons broke the all-time professional sports record for most consecutive sellouts by selling out the stadium for the 815th consecutive game, breaking the record formerly held by the Portland Trail Blazers.

The park has a total capacity of 8,200 people and opened in 2000. With two-deck seating and large skyboxes, some compare it to Triple-A fields.

History
The Dayton Dragons played their first baseball game at Fifth Third Field on April 27, 2000. In attendance was Cincinnati Reds Hall of Famer Johnny Bench, who caught the ceremonial first pitch.

In their inaugural season, the Dragons managed to sell-out every home game of the 2000 season before the season even started.

Day Air Ballpark has hosted the Midwest League All Star Game twice: in 2001 and 2013.

In 2005, 2007, and 2009, the venue hosted the Atlantic 10 Conference baseball tournament. In 2005, Rhode Island won the tournament, in 2007, Charlotte won, and in 2009 Xavier won.

2011 field renovation
In the 2011–2012 offseason, a new Kentucky Blue Grass playing surface was installed at Fifth Third Field as well as new drainage and irrigation systems.

2014–2015 video enhancements
In 2014, over $1.2 million was spent upgrading Fifth Third Field's entertainment control room and adding HD cameras throughout. In 2015, the existing video board was replaced in the off-season with a new 2,054 foot 13HD video board that was three times brighter than the previous board, twice the height and 2½ times the width. Described as featuring the clearest picture ever used on any board in a Minor League Baseball stadium, the board, at the time of installation, was the tallest and widest in a single A facility and in the top five in terms of size for any Minor League Baseball stadium. As of 2015, only three out of 30 Major League Baseball stadiums sported a board of this type.

Renaming and renewal
In January 2020, the naming rights to the field were purchased by Day Air Credit Union and the stadium was renamed Day Air Ballpark. In January 2021, it was reported that the Dayton City Commission had renewed the park's lease agreement, which had previously been scheduled to expire in September 2030, until 2060. Under the terms of the new agreement, the city will also secure financing for up to $4.5 million in improvements to the park, including improvements relating to energy efficiency.

Facts and figures
 Voted as one of the top ten hottest tickets to get in all of professional sports by Sports Illustrated.
 The Dayton Dragons' series of 815 consecutive sellouts surpassed the Portland Trail Blazers for the longest sellout streak across all professional sports in the U.S.
 Highest single-season attendance: 593,633 (2004, a Midwest League Record)
 The facility has 7,320 stadium-style seats.
 The ballpark contains 1,400 club seats, 29 suites, and 3 party decks
 The stadium stands on the site of a former Delco Electronics plant.

Amenities
Day Air Ballpark has contracted with Donatos Pizza to offer individual cheese and pepperoni pizzas at the ballpark. It has also contracted with Cold Stone Creamery to offer hand dipped ice cream available at a free standing cart on the third base side of the stadium as well as individual ice cream cups available at most concession stands. Along with the contracted food, many nonprofit organizations including churches, fraternal organizations and schools operate the concessions stands. In 2009, The People for Ethical Treatment of Animals (PETA) rated Day Air Ballpark one of the most vegetarian-friendly minor league ballparks in the United States.

References

External links
 www.daytondragons.com
 Fifth Third Field Views–Ball Parks of the Minor Leagues

Minor league baseball venues
Baseball venues in Ohio
Sports venues in Dayton, Ohio
Tourist attractions in Dayton, Ohio
Baseball in Dayton, Ohio
Sports venues completed in 2000
2000 establishments in Ohio
Midwest League ballparks